Anchisa Chanta (born 12 September 2002) is a Thai tennis player.

Chanta has a career-high singles ranking of 586 by the Women's Tennis Association (WTA), achieved on 24 June 2019. She also has a career-high WTA doubles ranking of 744, achieved on 17 June 2019. Up to date, she has won one singles ITF title.

Chanta also represents Thailand in Fed Cup competition.

ITF Circuit finals

Singles: 2 (1 title, 1 runner–up)

Doubles: 3 (3 runner–ups)

Billie Jean King Cup participation

Singles

References

External links
 
 
 

2002 births
Living people
Anchisa Chanta
Competitors at the 2019 Southeast Asian Games
Anchisa Chanta
Southeast Asian Games medalists in tennis
Anchisa Chanta
Competitors at the 2021 Southeast Asian Games